"It's Not Christmas Till Somebody Cries" is a Christmas song by Canadian singer Carly Rae Jepsen, released on October 30, 2020. The song is about "expectation versus reality" when it comes to holiday celebrations and "the antics of a dyfunctional family holiday gathering".

Personnel
Credits adapted from Tidal.
Carly Rae Jepsen – songwriting, lead vocals
Benjamin Romans – songwriting, production, background vocals, programming, synthesizer
CJ Baran – songwriting, production, background vocals, programming
James Flannigan – songwriting
Gene Grimaldi – mastering engineer
Mitch McCarthy – mixing

Charts

References

2020 singles
2020 songs
Christmas songs
Carly Rae Jepsen songs
Songs about friendship
Songs written by Ben Romans
Songs written by Carly Rae Jepsen
Songs written by CJ Baran
Songs written by James Flannigan (songwriter)
Synth-pop songs